The Pagidipalli–Nallapadu section is an electrified single track railway section in Guntur railway division of South Central Railway.

History 
The Guntur–Macherla section was opened in 1930.

In 2023 the Centre cleared the doubling of Guntur-Bibinagar railway. The long-pending project is estimated to cost 2,853 crore and will be monitored by the Prime Minister's Office.

Route 

References 

5 ft 6 in gauge railways in India
Rail transport in Andhra Pradesh
Railway lines opened in 1930
1930 establishments in India